The 2021 FIU Panthers football team represented Florida International University (FIU) in the 2021 NCAA Division I FBS football season. The Panthers played their home games at Riccardo Silva Stadium in Miami, Florida, and competed in the East Division of Conference USA (C-USA). They were led by fifth-year head coach Butch Davis.

The season was marred by drama and controversy, with athletic director Pete Garcia clearing his desk out in the middle of the night, with no prior announcement or news conference. A few days later, it was announced that head coach Butch Davis would not be returning following the season. Davis alleged that university administrators had cut the football program's budget by $500,000 each year for the past two years and that coaches were not allowed to recruit on the road. University administrators have not commented on Davis's allegations.

Previous season
The 2020 team finished the COVID-19 impacted season with an overall record of 0–5 and a conference record of 0–3, finishing in last place in the Conference-USA East Division. Offensive coordinator Rich Skrosky was fired on December 23, 2020 after four seasons. Co-defensive coordinators Jeff Copp and Jerod Kruse were both fired following the season, both serving in the position for two seasons.

Preseason

C-USA media days
The Panthers were predicted to finish in sixth place in the East Division in the Conference USA preseason poll.

Schedule

Personnel

Game summaries

LIU

Texas State

at Texas Tech

at Central Michigan

at Florida Atlantic

Charlotte

Western Kentucky

at Marshall

Old Dominion

at Middle Tennessee

North Texas

at Southern Miss

References

FIU
FIU Panthers football seasons
FIU Panthers football